Mitchellton is a hamlet in Lake Johnston Rural Municipality No. 102, Saskatchewan, Canada. It previously held the status of a village until January 1, 1939.

Demographics

Prior to January 1, 1939, Mitchellton was incorporated as a village, and was restructured as a hamlet under the jurisdiction of the Rural municipality of Lake Johnston No. 102 on that date.

See also

List of communities in Saskatchewan
Hamlets of Saskatchewan

References

Lake Johnston No. 102, Saskatchewan
Former villages in Saskatchewan
Unincorporated communities in Saskatchewan
Division No. 3, Saskatchewan